Marlene Clark Poulter McPherson is an American television soap opera writer.

Positions held
All My Children
 Co-head writer: April 29, 2013 – September 2, 2013

Days of Our Lives
 Co head writer: August 26, 2011 – August 16, 2012
 Associate head writer: 1993 - 1999
 Script writer: 1991 - 1993

General Hospital
Script continuity (1989)

Passions
 Associate head writer: 1999 - August 7, 2008

Swiss Family Robinson
 Co-creator/writer  2009

Awards and nominations
Daytime Emmy Award
Win, 2012 (for 2011 season), Best Writing,  Days of Our Lives
Nomination, 2001–2003, Best Writing, Passions
Nomination, 1994, 1997–1999, Best Writing, Days of our Lives

Writers Guild of America Award
Nomination, 2000, Best Writing, Passions
Win, 1999, Best Writing, Days of our Lives
Nomination, 1991, 1993, Best Writing, Days of our Lives

External links

American soap opera writers
Writers Guild of America Award winners
Living people
Year of birth missing (living people)